Operation Hammer Down was a seven-day U.S.-led air-assault offensive in June 2011 designed to eliminate foreign fighters and training camps in the Watapur Valley of Kunar Province in Afghanistan in preparation of an eventual push into the Western Pech area. The operation's primary objective was to destroy suspected training camps at the northern end of the Watapur in order to interdict the flow of insurgents through the valley and forbid the Taliban from increasing their manpower in the western Pech. This operation was conducted by the 2nd Battalion 35th Infantry, 3rd Brigade Combat Team, 25th Infantry Division (Task Force Cacti) as a battalion-wide mission that spread each element throughout the area of operations

See also
War in Afghanistan
International Security Assistance Force

References

External links

 The Christian Science Monitor - Battle for Afghanistan's Gambir Jungle: Into the 'Valley of Death'

Military operations of the War in Afghanistan (2001–2021)